Maria Antònia Oliver Cabrer (4 December 1946 – 10 February 2022) was a Spanish writer. Her work has been translated into German, English, Spanish, Galician, French, Portuguese, and Russian. She was honored with the Premi d'Honor de les Lletres Catalanes in 2016.

Life
Born in Manacor, Balearic Islands, Oliver was a resident of Barcelona from 1969. Oliver was known for her novels and short stories, and was also a Castilian and Catalan language translator. In the 1980s, Oliver joined a number of other Catalan-language writers to form the Ofèlia Dracs collective, looking to bring attention to, and broaden the output of deepening Catalan literature. 

Oliver's first work was published in 1970. While most of her work has been for adult readers, some is aimed at children and youth. In addition to novel and short stories, she has written plays (Negroni de ginebra ; 1991), screenplays, as well as stories for radio (Catalunya Ràdio) and television (TV3; TVE Catalunya). She has worked for El Correo Catalán, Diario de Mallorca, Última hora, and Diari de Barcelona. Writing in Catalan, many of her works have been translated into Castilian, German, English, Galician and Russian.

Oliver was married to the writer Jaume Fuster. She has served as dean of Institució de les Lletres Catalanes (2001-2004). She died on 10 February 2022, at the age of 75.

Selected works
 Cròniques d'un mig estiu (1970)
 Cròniques de la molt anomenada ciutat de Montcarrà (1972)
 El vaixell d'Iràs i no Tornaràs (1976)
 Punt d'arròs (1979)
 Crineres de foc (1985)
 Estudi en lila (1985)
 Antípodes (1988)
 Joana E. (1992)
 El sol que fa l'ànec (1994)
 Amor de cans (1994)
 Tallats de lluna (2000)

Awards

 Prudenci Bertrana Prize
 2001, Outstanding Achievement Award of the Llibre Setmana in Catalan
 2003, Ramon Llull Prize, Balearic Government 
 Finalist for the Sant Jordi Prize (1984) for Crineres de foc
 Prize for Catalan Literature of the Generalitat of Catalonia (1985) for the translation of Moby Dick
 Jaume Fuster Prize for Catalan Writers (2004)
 Premi d'Honor de les Lletres Catalanes (2016)

References

External links
 
 

1946 births
2022 deaths
People from Manacor
Spanish women novelists
Women writers from Catalonia